is a novel by Japanese author Ryōtarō Shiba. It dramatizes the life of Hijikata Toshizō, a member of the Shinsengumi, active in Japan during the bakumatsu (the end of the Tokugawa shogunate).

The novel was initially serialized from 1962 to 1964 in the Bungeishunjū weekly magazine Shūkan Bunshun. Shinchosha published the complete novel in two volumes. The action takes place in the Ōkunitama Shrine in Fuchū, along the Asa River in and near Hachiōji, in the Mibu area of Kyoto, and in Hokkaidō.

Shochiku released a 1966 film of the same title. Asahi Kurizuka played Hijikata. He repeated the role in the prime-time television jidaigeki on NET.

Movie and TV adaptations

Cast (1966 film)
 
Asahi Kurizuka as Hijikata Toshizō
Shun'ya Wazaki as Kondō Isami
Hidehiko Ishikura as Okita Sōji
Tetsuko Kobayashi as Sae
Keiji Takamiya as Niimi Nishiki

Cast (1966 TV series)
Ryōhei Uchida as Hijikata Toshizō
Asao Koike as Kondō Isami
Ryōtarō Sugi as Okita Sōji
Reiko Hitomi as Osae

Cast (1970 TV series)
Asahi Kurizuka as Hijikata Toshizō
Gen Funabashi as Kondō Isami
Junshi Shimada as Okita Sōji
Jūkei Fujioka as Endō
Susumu Kurobe as Nagakura Shinpachi
Ryō Nishida as Harada Sanosuke
Seiya Nakano as Yamazaki Susumu
Eizō Kitamura as Inoue Genzaburō

Cast (1990 TV mini-series)
Kōji Yakusho as Hijikata Toshizō
Tomoko Ogawa as Oyuki
Tetsuo Ishidate as Kondō Isami
Terutake Tsuji as Okita Sōji
Hisako Manda as Sae
Masaomi Kondō as Itō Kashitarō

Cast (2021 film)

Junichi Okada as Hijikata Toshizō
Ko Shibasaki as Oyuki
Ryohei Suzuki as Kondō Isami
Ryosuke Yamada as Okita Sōji
Hideaki Itō as Serizawa Kamo

See also

References

Sources
 This article incorporates material from 燃えよ剣 (Moeyo Ken) in the Japanese Wikipedia, retrieved on March 15, 2008.

External links
 司馬遼太郎『燃えよ剣〔上〕』｜新潮社 "Shiba Ryōtarō Moeyo Ken (vol. 1)"
 司馬遼太郎『燃えよ剣〔下〕』｜新潮社 "Shiba Ryōtarō Moeyo Ken (vol. 2)"

1964 novels
Japanese historical novels
Japanese novels adapted into films
Jidaigeki
Novels first published in serial form
Novels set in Japan
Works originally published in Japanese magazines
Cultural depictions of Tokugawa Yoshinobu